Frank Ludlow (17 April 1902 – 3 June 1957) was an  Australian rules footballer who played with North Melbourne in the Victorian Football League (VFL).

Notes

External links 

1902 births
1957 deaths
Australian rules footballers from Victoria (Australia)
North Melbourne Football Club players
Northcote Football Club players